A language school is a school where one studies a foreign language. Classes at a language school are usually geared towards, for example, communicative competence in a foreign language. Language learning in such schools typically supplements formal education or existing knowledge of a foreign language.

Students vary widely by age, educational background, work experience. They usually have the possibility of selecting a specific course according to their language proficiency. According to the Common European Framework of Reference for Languages (CEFR), there are six language levels that define student language proficiency based on their speaking, writing and reading skills. Students will be then assigned to the course that matches their skills.

Structure 
As a general rule, new students take a placement test which enables teachers to determine which is the most appropriate level for the student. Courses can be organized in groups or for individuals (one-to-one lessons). Private language schools are generally open year-round and are equipped with pedagogical material (books, tape recorders, videos, language laboratories, a library, etc.)

Organization
Most language schools are private and for-profit. Fees vary depending on a multitude of factors, including local cost of living, exchange rates, and demand for the language in the area where a school is located.  Language schools are either independent entities or corporate franchises.

Teachers
Teachers are expected to possess native speaker fluency or acquired competence in their target languages; formal qualifications to become a language teacher, however, vary by school, region or country. This ensures the quality of the language school and provides students with a richer experience. Teachers may have graduated with a BA, Master's degree or a PhD Pedagogy, experience and strong teaching skills are the principal criteria during the recruitment of the language school's teachers.

Accommodation
Many language schools offer various kinds of accommodation to their students: host family (homestays), campus residences, shared housing, or hotels.

Qualifications
Most students will sit an international language exam and receive an internationally recognized qualification.

International language exams
Language schools commonly offer specific programs to those wishing to prepare for internationally recognized language exams such as: 
 TOEIC (English)
 TOEFL (English)
 CaMLA (English)
 TrackTest (English)
 University of Toronto TEFL (English)
 Cambridge English Language Assessment (English)
 DELF/DALF (French)
 TestDaF (German)
 SIELE (Spanish)
 DELE (Spanish)
 JLPT (Japanese)
 TOPIK (Korean)
 HSK (Chinese Mandarin)
 DELI/DILI/DALI (Italian)

Some organizations combine language study with travel to destinations where the language is natively spoken.  This concept of immersion travel makes it easier for students to experience and understand the destination country's culture and language.

Language courses

English

Globally, English language schools have seen the greatest demand over schools for other languages.  Over one billion people are said to be learning English in a second language or foreign language context. In the United States alone, ESL learners make up over one-third of all adult, non-academic learners. English learning has experienced the highest increase in demand over the last three years, with an increase of 67%.  The United States and the UK are the biggest players in the global English travel market accounting for 62% of the total revenue earned in 2013, and account for 65.5% of students worldwide.

English language schools are also among the most numerous in Asian countries such as China, Japan and South Korea, as Western culture influences the rising demand for English in business and cultural contexts.

Arabic 

Arabic has also grown in popularity in the last decade. Reasons include the continued growth of Islam worldwide (the Koran holy book is in Arabic), as well as cultural, economic and political reasons.

Hindi

The Hindi language along with the culture of the Indian subcontinent has started to become important due to recent foreign policies, global competitiveness, and emigration from the country.  Hindi began to be introduced as a foreign language in some American schools in the 2000s. Instructors in the language were sought to teach from the kindergarten level right up to the university as part of the National Security Language Initiative.

See also
Language education
English language learning and teaching
English as a Foreign or Second Language
Français langue étrangère
Arabic language school
Second language acquisition

References

External links
 Council of Europe Language Policy Unit
 International Association of Language Centres